William Shrewsbury (30 April 1854 – 14 November 1931) was an English first-class cricketer active from 1875–79 who played for Nottinghamshire. He was born in New Lenton and died in Fiskerton, Nottinghamshire.

He was the elder brother of Nottinghamshire and England cricketer Arthur Shrewsbury. His son, Arthur, also played for the county.

References

1854 births
1931 deaths
English cricketers
Nottinghamshire cricketers